Bertram Meier (born July 20 1960 in Buchloe, Bavaria) is a German prelate of the Roman Catholic Church. He served as bishop of Roman Catholic Diocese of Augsburg since 2020.

Life  
Meier studied Roman Catholic theology at the University of Augsburg and in Rome at Pontifical Gregorian University. He was ordained as priest on 10 October 1985. In 2020, Meier became Roman Catholic Bishop of Augsburg. On 29 January 2020, he was appointed bishop of Augsburg.

References

External links 
 Entry about Konrad Zdarsa at catholic-hierarchy.org
 Bistum Augsburg: Biography of Bertram Meier

1960 births
21st-century German Roman Catholic bishops
21st-century Roman Catholic bishops in Germany
Roman Catholic bishops of Augsburg
Living people
Clergy from Bavaria